Ana Ma'akon was released in 1993 as Najwa Karam's third album, and is her least successful album to date.

Track listing
 "Ana Ma'akon"  (I'm with you)
 "Mdallalin" (Loved) 
 "Law Sa'alouni" (If they asked me) 
 "Ya Asir El Rouh" (You who kidnapped my heart) 
 "Mara'ou" (They passed) 
 "Dam'a" (A tear) 
 "Najmet El Subhi" (Morning star)

1993 albums
Najwa Karam albums